USS City of Corpus Christi (SSN-705), a , was the second ship of the United States Navy to be named for Corpus Christi, Texas. The Navy originally planned to use the name "USS Corpus Christi."

Etymology
The "City of" prefix was added before its 1983 commissioning to clarify that the ship is meant to honor the city, in response to Catholic politicians who protested against naming a warship using Latin words which translate to "Body of Christ."

History
The contract to build her was awarded to the Electric Boat Division of General Dynamics Corporation in Groton, Connecticut on 31 October 1973 and her keel was laid down on 4 September 1979.  She was launched on 25 April 1981 sponsored by Mrs. John Tower, and commissioned on 8 January 1983. The ship's patch was chosen by the crew based on entries to an art contest sponsored by the Corpus Christi, Texas city government.

During the naval Exercise Malabar, between the navies of India, the United States and Japan, in a simulated battle, the Indian Navy's  reportedly scored a kill against City of Corpus Christi. Sindhudhvaj is a Soviet-built , but upgraded with the Indian USHUS sonar.

The ship is currently berthed at Puget Sound Naval Shipyard in Bremerton, Washington, having moved there after being deactivated on 30 May 2016.

References
This article includes information collected from the Naval Vessel Register and various press releases.

External links

Los Angeles-class submarines
Cold War submarines of the United States
Nuclear submarines of the United States Navy
Corpus Christi, Texas
Ships built in Groton, Connecticut
1981 ships
Submarines of the United States